The 2019 season is the second season for Persebaya Surabaya after being reaccepted as a member of PSSI, in the 2018 season, Persebaya was ranked 5th.

Squad information

Current squad

Naturalized player

Starting eleven
4-3-3

Transfer

Pre-season

Transfer in

Transfer Out

Pre-season and Friendlies

President's Cup 
In this 2019 President's Cup Persebaya is joined in group A along with Persib Bandung, Perseru Serui, and TIRA-Persikabo. All matches were held at Si Jalak Harupat Stadium, Soreang, Bandung, West Java.

Group A

Matches

Knockout stage 

Persebaya qualified for the knock out stage after becoming the top of the group A. Once again Persebaya met TIRAPersikabo when a knockout stage drawing.

Matches

Semi-final 

Persebaya qualified for Semi Final stage after Win from TIRAPersikabo in quarter final Stage. In the semi final Persebaya met Madura United in Home Away Match.

Final 

Persebaya qualified for Final stage after Win from Madura United in semi final Stage. In the Final Persebaya meet Arema in Home Away Match.

Friendlies

Liga 1

League table

Fixtures
The Liga 1 (Indonesia) fixtures for the 2019 season were announced on 4 April 2019.

Piala Indonesia

References 

Persebaya Surabaya